Aubusson is the name or part of the name of several communes in France:

 Aubusson, Creuse, in the Creuse département, well known for the manufacture of Aubusson tapestry and carpets
 Aubusson, Orne, in the Orne département
 Aubusson-d'Auvergne, in the Puy-de-Dôme département